Get Cape. Wear Cape. Fly/Dave House is a split EP between featuring Get Cape. Wear Cape. Fly and Dave House. Each artist contributed one of their own songs, as well as a cover of one of their counterpart's songs. It was released in a limited pressing of 500 on 10" white vinyl, and was a joint release by each artist's respective record label. This record became the first part in the Gravity DIP split 10" series.

Track listing

References 

Split EPs
Get Cape. Wear Cape. Fly albums
2006 EPs
Big Scary Monsters Recording Company EPs